

Error tolerance (PAC learning)
In PAC learning, error tolerance refers to the ability of an algorithm to learn when the examples received have been corrupted in some way. In fact, this is a very common and important issue since in many applications it is not possible to access noise-free data. Noise can interfere with the learning process at different levels: the algorithm may receive data that have been occasionally mislabeled, or the inputs may have some false information, or the classification of the examples may have been maliciously adulterated.

Notation and the Valiant learning model
In the following, let  be our -dimensional input space. The goal of a learning algorithm  is to choose the best function  such that it minimizes . Let  be an oracle that, whenever called, returns an example  and its correct label .

When no noise corrupts the data, we can define learning in the Valiant setting:

Definition:

In the following we will define learnability of  when data have suffered some modification.

Classification noise
In the classification noise model a noise rate  is introduced. As in the Valiant case, the goal of a learning algorithm  is to choose the best function  such that it minimizes . Note that if we allow the noise rate to be , then learning becomes impossible in any amount of computation time, because every label conveys no information about the target function.

Definition:

Statistical query learning
Statistical Query Learning is a kind of active learning problem in which the learning algorithm  can decide if to request information about the likelihood  that a function  correctly labels example , and receives an answer accurate within a tolerance . Formally, whenever the learning algorithm  calls the oracle , it receives as feedback probability , such that .

Definition:
  can evaluate  in time ;
  is bounded by 

Note that the confidence parameter  does not appear in the definition of learning. Since now  always guarantees to meet the approximation criterion , the failure probability is no longer needed.

The statistical query model is strictly weaker than the PAC model: any efficiently SQ-learnable class is efficiently PAC learnable in the presence of classification noise, but there exist efficient PAC-learnable problems such as parity that are not efficiently SQ-learnable.

Malicious classification
In the malicious classification model an adversary generates errors to foil the learning algorithm. This setting describes situations of error burst, which may occur when for a limited time transmission equipment malfunctions repeatedly.

Definition:

Errors in the inputs: nonuniform random attribute noise
In the nonuniform random attribute noise model the algorithm is learning a Boolean function, a malicious oracle  may flip each -th bit of example  independently with probability .

This type of error can irreparably foil the algorithm, in fact the following theorem holds:

In the nonuniform random attribute noise setting, an algorithm  can output a function  such that  only if .

See also

References

Theoretical computer science
Computational learning theory